A. W. M. Abdul Haque is a Bangladesh Awami League politician and the former Member of Parliament of Comilla-7.

Career
Haque was elected to parliament from Comilla-7 as a Bangladesh Awami League candidate in 1973.

References

Awami League politicians
Living people
1st Jatiya Sangsad members
Year of birth missing (living people)